Viktoriya Pereverzeva (born 13 October 1996) is a Kazakhstani rhythmic gymnast.

She competed at the 2013 World Rhythmic Gymnastics Championships.

References

External links 
 Viktoriya PEREVERZEVA hoop - 2012 Vitry Cup *senior* - YouTube

Living people

1996 births
20th-century Kazakhstani women
21st-century Kazakhstani women